Raúl Caldeira (21 January 1927 – 7 December 2020) was a Portuguese gymnast. He competed in eight events at the 1952 Summer Olympics.

References

1927 births
2020 deaths
Portuguese male artistic gymnasts
Olympic gymnasts of Portugal
Gymnasts at the 1952 Summer Olympics
Place of birth missing
20th-century Portuguese people